Hretska Square, or Hretska Ploshcha is one of the main squares of Odesa. It is on the crossing of Hretska Street and Oleksandrivskyi Prospekt. At different times it has been called Aleksandrovskaya or Martynovskogo. This is one of the biggest squares of Odesa. It is rectangular, with the oval building of Mayurov House in the center, also with semi-round houses on the sides.

This is the oldest square in Odesa. It survived from the market square of the town of Khadzhibey. Down by Hretska Street, between Hretska Ploshcha and Katerynynska Street, was a Muslim cemetery. After the capture of the Khadzhibey Fortress the square was free of buildings. The building construction started from the part close to Hretska Street, later from Deribasivska Street. The buildings were built mainly by Greeks in Ukraine of the families Ioannopulos, Serafinos, Papakhadzhis, Rallis, and Maraslis. The Greek secret society Filiki Eteria ( is the Society of Friends) (whose aim was the struggle for independence of Greece) was in one of the buildings on the square since 1814.

The main market of the city was in the square for a long time. The garden square was in the centre of the square until the Greek Orthodox church was built. But the church building was not finished, and its foundations were re-used for building Mayurov House, also known as the Roundhouse. The last construction was a mall.

In the Soviet period the square was an important transport centre. Here was the tram station (later the trolleybus station), also the bus terminal. The semi-round house which separated the square from the Bunina Street, was demolished during World War II. The place was used as a garden in the 1950s and 1960s, but later the modern restaurant building was constructed. Mayurov House was demolished in 1996 and then rebuilt with significant changes.

References

Links 

 Греческая площадь (Александровская, Мартыновского)
 Про Греческую площадь и не только
 Греческая площадь
 Греческая площадь
 Из воспоминаний об Одессе

Squares in Odesa